The San Luis Gonzaga Parish Church, also referred to as San Luis Church, is a 19th-century Baroque church located at Brgy. Poblacion, San Luis, Pampanga, Philippines. The parish church, dedicated to Saint Aloysius Gonzaga, is under the Roman Catholic Archdiocese of San Fernando.

History

Town History
San Luis, formerly referred to as San Nicolas de Cabagsac after its former vicar, Father Nicolas de Orduño, or simply cabagsa meaning a "place where plenty of fruit bats are caught" was founded by the Augustinian missionaries in 1742. Father Ambrosio de San Agustin was assigned as its first priest on April 25, 1744.

Church History
Records do not tell of the exact date of the construction of the present-day church although it was stated that Father Isidro Bernardo restored the said church structure in 1883. Father Francisco Diaz, then, enlarged the convent in 1877.

Architecture
The church facade is predominantly Baroque in style with the roughness and heaviness of its looks although some hints of Renaissance style can be found on the details of its twin belfries. The recessed main portal showcases a relief of the papal symbol and is flanked by two heavily-ornamented saints' niches. Stone balusters decorate the single window on the facade, the blind windows flanking it and the base of the pediment. Dominating the facade are columns capped with Ionic capitals and scroll-like volutes on the pediment.

References

External links

Roman Catholic churches in Pampanga
Baroque architecture in the Philippines
Spanish Colonial architecture in the Philippines
Churches in the Roman Catholic Archdiocese of San Fernando